Atuona Airport or Hiva Oa Airport  is an airport located  northeast of Atuona, on the island of Hiva Oa, in the Marquesas Islands of French Polynesia.

Previously, that airport had been assigned the HIX IATA location identifier, which has then been deprecated by IATA in 2012.

Airlines and destinations

Statistics

References

Airports in French Polynesia